The 2004 V8 Supercar season was the 45th year of touring car racing in Australia since the first runnings of the Australian Touring Car Championship and the fore-runner of the present day Bathurst 1000, the Armstrong 500.

There were 21 touring car race meetings held during 2004; a thirteen-round series for V8 Supercars, the 2004 V8 Supercar Championship Series (VCS), two of them endurance races; a six-round second tier V8 Supercar series 2004 Konica Minolta V8 Supercar Series (KVS) along with a non-point scoring race supporting the Bathurst 1000 and V8 Supercar support programme event at the 2004 Australian Grand Prix.

Results and standings

Race calendar
The 2004 Australian touring car season consisted of 21 events.

Konica Minolta V8 Supercar Series

Netspace V8Supercars GP 100 
This meeting was a support event of the 2004 Australian Grand Prix.

V8 Supercar Championship Series

Konica Minolta V8Supercar Challenge 
This race was a support event of the 2004 Bob Jane T-Marts 1000.

References

Additional references can be found in linked event/series reports.

External links
 Official V8 Supercar site
 2004 Racing Results Archive 

 
Supercar seasons